The yellow-bellied greenbul (Chlorocichla flaviventris) is a species of songbird in the bulbul family, Pycnonotidae.  It is found in eastern, southern and west-central Africa.  Its natural habitats are subtropical or tropical dry forests, subtropical or tropical moist lowland forests, and dry savanna.

Taxonomy and systematics
The yellow-bellied greenbul was originally described in the genus Trichophorus (a synonym for Criniger) and then re-classified within Chlorocichla. Alternate names for the yellow-bellied greenbul include the African yellow-bellied bulbul, yellow-bellied bulbul, yellow-breasted bulbul, yellow-breasted greenbul and yellow-necked greenbul. The latter name is also used as an alternate name by Falkenstein's greenbul. The name 'yellow-bellied bulbul' should not be confused with the species of the same name, Alophoixus phaeocephalus.

Subspecies
Three subspecies of the yellow-bellied greenbul are recognized:
  Kenya yellow-bellied greenbul (C. f. centralis) - Reichenow, 1887: Originally described as a separate species. Also named the Muanza yellow-throated greenbul. Found from southern Somalia to northern Mozambique	
  Zambezi yellow-bellied greenbul (C. f. occidentalis) - Sharpe, 1882: Originally described as a separate species. Found from north-western Angola to western Tanzania south to north-western Namibia, northern Botswana, northern South Africa and central Mozambique	
  C. f. flaviventris - (Smith, A, 1834): Found in eastern South Africa and southern Mozambique

References

External links
 (Yellow-bellied greenbul = ) Yellow-belled bulbul - Species text in The Atlas of Southern African Birds.

yellow-bellied greenbul
Birds of Southern Africa
yellow-bellied greenbul
Taxonomy articles created by Polbot